Pier-André Côté (born 24 April 1997) is a Canadian cyclist, who currently rides for UCI ProTeam .

Major results

2014
 1st  Time trial, National Junior Road Championships
2015
 National Junior Road Championships
3rd Time trial
3rd Road race
 4th Overall Tour de l'Abitibi
1st Stage 5
2017
 Canada Summer Games
1st Criterium
1st Road race
2nd Time trial
 National Road Championships
1st  Criterium
3rd Road race
 National Under-23 Road Championships
1st  Criterium
2nd Road race
2018
 1st Stages 1 & 5 Tour de Beauce
2019
 5th White Spot / Delta Road Race
 7th Overall Tour de Beauce
 9th Overall Grand Prix Cycliste de Saguenay
1st Stages 2, 3 & 4
2021
 6th Classic Loire Atlantique
 9th Overall Tour Poitou-Charentes en Nouvelle-Aquitaine
2022
 1st Grand Prix Criquielion
 8th Memorial Rik Van Steenbergen

References

External links

1997 births
Living people
Canadian male cyclists
People from Gaspé, Quebec
Cyclists from Quebec